Music Bank may refer to:

 Music Bank (TV series), a South Korean music program by KBS
Music Bank World Tour, Music Bank television program global concert tour
 Music Bank (album), a box set by Alice in Chains
 Music Bank: The Videos, a video release by Alice in Chains